Mitrofan (Mitrophan) Yefimovich Pyatnitsky (– 21 January 1927) was a Russian and Soviet musician, gatherer of Russian folk songs. He established the famous Pyatnitsky Choir in 1910 from 18 peasants originally from the Voronezh, Ryazan and Smolensk gubernias.  After his death, the chorus was named after him.

1864 births
1927 deaths
Russian musicians